John Shipp may refer to:

 John Shipp (British Army officer) (1785–1834), British army soldier
John Shipp (vet) (fl. 1796), British army veterinary surgeon
 John Wesley Shipp, American actor